Harvard Jolly is a St. Petersburg, Florida based architectural firm known for its work on school, healthcare and public buildings. It was founded as a solo practice in 1938 by William B. Harvard Sr. With the addition of Blanchard E. Jolly as partner, the firm became Harvard Jolly in 1961. In the 1970s Enrique M. Marcet, R. John Clees, John Toppe, and William B. Harvard Jr. joined the firm, which became known as Harvard Jolly Clees Toppe Architecture for some time. Harvard Jolly has offices in St. Petersburg, West Palm Beach, Tampa, Sarasota, Jacksonville, Tallahassee, Orlando, and Ft. Myers.

In 2012, Harvard Jolly was chosen along with Ikon 5 Architects of Princeton, New Jersey to design St. Petersburg College's College of Business building. In 2013 the firm was chosen to design a 111,000 square foot $60 million police headquarters building in St. Petersburg, Florida.

William B. Harvard Sr.
William B. Harvard Sr. was born in Waldo, Florida after graduating from Sewanee Military Academy he attended the University of Cincinnati in the mid 1930s. He came home to Florida after his father's death during the Great Depression, originally apprenticing in Miami. Harvard set up his own practice after a commission brought him to St. Petersburg, Florida. Harvard Jolly is known for his modern architecture designs including the St. Petersburg Pier, bandshell in Williams Park, Hospitality House at Busch Gardens, and Pasadena Community Church.

Recent works by Harvard Jolly
Sarasota High School (Redesign & renovations)
Fivay High School, Hudson, Florida
Booker High School, Sarasota, Florida
Lemon Bay High School, Englewood, Florida 
Charlotte High School, Punta Gorda, (Renovation and reconstruction after Hurricane Charley)
Charlotte Harbor Events and Conference Center, Punta Gorda
Punta Gorda Middle School
Addition to the St. Petersburg Museum of Fine Arts
Sunken Gardens (Additions & renovations)
Albert Whitted Airport Terminal
Morton Plant Hospital—Morgan Heart Hospital (2007) Clearwater, Florida
East Cooper Regional Medical Center Replacement Hospital (2009) Mt. Pleasant, South Carolina 2009
North Fulton Regional Hospital (2007) Roswell, Georgia 2007

Early works

Langford Resort Hotel (1955) Winter Park, Florida
Caples Fine Arts Center complex, Sarasota, Florida 
Marina Civic Center renovation, Panama City, Florida
Bay Pines Veterans’ Administration Medical Center (1980s)
St. Petersburg Pier (Inverted pier built in 1973, since demolished as of 2015)
St. Joseph's Hospital, Tampa
Pasadena Community Church
Garden of Peace Lutheran Church
Grace Evangelical Lutheran Church on Haines Road
Derby Lane, a steel building
Tides Hotel
Langston Holland House in Pinellas Point
Central Library on 9th Avenue
National Bank on Tyrone Boulevard
Federal Building (Demolished)
Hospitality House at Busch Gardens (1959)
Williams Park Band Shell and Pavilion (1954), a 1955 recipient of the Award of Merit from the American Institute of Architects
2900 Pelham Dr. N.

Libraries
Harvard Jolly is a member of the American Library Association and the Florida Library Association. The firm has designed over 120 libraries and has received 19 awards for their designs.
Boca Raton Public Library
Oldsmar Public Library
Mirror Lake Library (Renovations)
Selby Public Library (Renovations)
Cagan Crossings Community Library
Leesburg Public Library
South Mandarin Branch Library
Gulf Gate Library
Countryside Library
University of South Florida Jane Bancroft Cook Library Addition/Renovation
Broward County/Broward College South Regional Library
Cooper Memorial Library at Lake-Sumter State College
Wilson S. Rivers Library and Media Center at Florida Gateway College
St. Petersburg College Dennis L. Jones Community Library on the Seminole Campus

References

Further reading
Harvard Jolly Clees Toppe Architecture, Booth-Clibborn Editions, 2000 , 9781861541529 120 pages

External links
Harvard Jolly website

Architecture firms based in Florida